The 2017 Grand Prix de Denain was the 59th edition of the Grand Prix de Denain road cycling one day race. It was part of the 2017 UCI Europe Tour, held on 13 April 2017, as a 1.HC categorised race.

Teams
Eighteen teams were invited to take part in the race. These included two UCI WorldTeams, thirteen UCI Professional Continental teams and three UCI Continental teams.

Result

References

External links

2017
2017 UCI Europe Tour
2017 in French sport